Tufan Esin (born 7 August 1980 in Silifke, Turkey), is a Turkish footballer who plays for Diyarbakirspor as a forward.

Esin previously played for Manisaspor in the 2005–06 Turkish Super Lig season.

References

External links
Guardian's Stats Centre

1980 births
Living people
Turkish footballers
Eskişehirspor footballers
Samsunspor footballers
Manisaspor footballers
Diyarbakırspor footballers
People from Silifke
Association football forwards